Nikita is an urban-type settlement in Yalta Municipality of the Autonomous Republic of Crimea, a territory recognized by a majority of countries as part of Ukraine and incorporated by Russia as the Republic of Crimea. It is known for the Nikitsky Botanical Garden named after the settlement. Population: 

Originally it was a village of Nikita owned by a landowner Smirnov, bought by the state in 1811 for the creation of the botanical garden. During the times of the Soviet Union the settlement was renamed into Botanicheskoye ("Botanical" in Russian). The name was restored after the dissolution of the Soviet Union.

References

External links
 

Urban-type settlements in Crimea
Seaside resorts in Russia
Seaside resorts in Ukraine
Yalta Municipality